Hapljapyx is a genus of diplurans in the family Japygidae.

Haplijapyx are typical Diplurans. They are small, white, eyeless, entognathous hexapoda with moniliform antennae (antenna with equally sized spherical segments that looks like a string of beads). They have two abdominal, pincer-like cerci so they are often mistaken for earwigs (Dermaptera) but earwigs have eyes. Hapljapyx are described as the most robust members of the family Japygidae.

Biology

Fertilisation is similar to that of the Collembola where the male deposits a spermatophore on the ground. This is taken up by a female, who then lays her eggs in clumps in rotting vegetation or in crevices in the soil. Some species are known to guard their eggs and young. Young diplurans resemble adults. Moulting continues throughout life and an adult may moult up to 30 times during its lifespan of about a 1 year. Hapljapyx are predatory carnivores and use their cerci to capture prey.

Species
 Hapljapyx bertonii Silvestri, 1948
 Hapljapyx carinii Silvestri, 1948
 Hapljapyx demadridi Silvestri, 1948
 Hapljapyx distinctellus Silvestri, 1948
 Hapljapyx lizeri Silvestri, 1948
 Hapljapyx lopesi Silvestri, 1948
 Hapljapyx meyerii Silvestri, 1948
 Hapljapyx oglobinii Silvestri, 1948
 Hapljapyx patagonicus (Silvestri, 1902)
 Hapljapyx patrizii Silvestri, 1948
 Hapljapyx platensis (Silvestri, 1902)
 Hapljapyx wygodzinskyi Silvestri, 1948

References

Diplura